Cambio 90 – New Majority (C90—NM) was a Peruvian right-wing electoral alliance eponymously formed by  pro-Fujimorist parties Cambio 90 and New Majority which ruled Peru from 1992 to 2000, serving more as an instrumental electoral vehicle for Alberto Fujimori.

History 
The alliance was formed in 1992 for the Democratic Constituent Congress election of that year in which they won a majority in the Democratic Constituent Congress and once again in the 1995 general election. In the 2000 general election, Cambio 90 and New Majority were part of Peru 2000 and the alliance was briefly dissolved.

In the aftermath of Alberto Fujimori's downfall in late 2000, the alliance was once again revived and participated at the 2001 general election, only running for Congress and only won 3 seats in Congress. For the 2006 general election, the alliance was dissolved and Cambio 90 and New Majority participated under the Alliance for the Future.

Electoral history

Presidential elections

Elections to the Congress of the Republic

Democratic Constituent Congress elections

References 

Conservative parties in Peru
Political parties established in 1992
Fujimorism
Defunct political party alliances in Peru